Bryan Mounkala (born November 29, 1996) better known as Bolémvn is a French rapper from Évry, Essonne, Île-de-France, France. He grew up in famous Bâtiment 7 in Évry where Koba LaD and Kodes also comes from. After releasing two EPs and notably "Eh boy", he signed with Capitol Label Services, a big rap label. His 2020 album Vol 169 was a huge success and charted in France, Belgium and Switzerland and reached number 15 on the French Albums Chart. This was followed up with the album Anarchiste in 2021.

Discography

Albums

Singles

Featured in

Other songs

References

French rappers
Living people
People from Évry, Essonne
1996 births